Forester Augustus Obeyesekere (7 August 1880 – 26 December 1961) was a prominent colonial era legislator from Ceylon. He was the Speaker of the State Council of Ceylon and a member of the Legislative Council of Ceylon.

Born to Sir Solomon Christoffel Obeyesekere a member of the Legislative Council, F A Obeysekera was educated at Royal College, Colombo, where he captained the cricket team at the Royal-Thomian and played for the Singhalese Sports Club. He later studied at Cambridge University.

He was elected an unofficial member from the Southern Province Central (Matara) to the Legislative Council in the 1924 Legislative Council election and retained his seat till the Legislative Council was dissolved and replaced by the State Council in the 1931 State Council election, when he was elected as deputy speaker. In 1934, he became Speaker when Sir Francis Molamure stepped down for personal reasons.

He married Amy Isabel Sykes and they had two children, Boykin and Ezlynne. Ezlynne married Ralph Deraniyagala, MBE who became the Clerk of Parliament.

See also
List of political families in Sri Lanka
Bandaranaike family

References

Speakers of the Parliament of Sri Lanka
Deputy speakers and chairmen of committees of the Parliament of Sri Lanka
Members of the 1st State Council of Ceylon
Members of the Legislative Council of Ceylon
Sinhalese politicians
Alumni of Royal College, Colombo
1880 births
1961 deaths
People from British Ceylon